Herman Joseph Sahadat Pandoyoputro O.Carm. (April 4, 1939 – September 23, 2016) was a Roman Catholic bishop.

Ordained to the priesthood in 1970, Pandoyoputro served as bishop of the Roman Catholic Diocese of Malang, Indonesia from 1989 until 2016

Notes

1939 births
2016 deaths
20th-century Roman Catholic bishops in Indonesia
21st-century Roman Catholic bishops in Indonesia
Carmelite bishops